Aramaya is a 1999 fantasy novel by Jane Routley. It follows the second book in the series, Fire Angels, with Dion arriving in the capitol of Akieva in search of her missing niece.

Background
Aramaya was first published in the United States on 8 June 1999 by Avon Eos in trade paperback format. It was released in the United States and Australia in mass market paperback format in June 2000 and October 2000 respectively. Aramaya won the 1999 Aurealis Award for best fantasy novel and was a short-list nominee for the 2000 Ditmar Award for best novel.

References

External links

1999 Australian novels
Australian fantasy novels
Aurealis Award-winning works
HarperCollins books